Ričardas Berankis was the defending champion but lost in the semifinals to Kamil Majchrzak.

Majchrzak won the title after defeating Maxime Janvier 6–3, 7–6(7–1) in the final.

Seeds
All seeds receive a bye into the second round.

Draw

Finals

Top half

Section 1

Section 2

Bottom half

Section 3

Section 4

References

External links
Main draw
Qualifying draw

Open Harmonie mutuelle - Singles
2019 Singles